The 2010 New Hampshire gubernatorial election was held on November 2, 2010. Incumbent Democratic Governor John Lynch was re-elected to his fourth term and final term.

New Hampshire is one of only two states where the Governor serves for a two-year term, the other being neighboring Vermont. Lynch was re-elected by landslide margins in 2006 and 2008, and enjoyed historically high approval ratings. In early 2010, his approval rating showed a downward trend, with an April poll indicating that his approval had fallen below 50% (44% approve, 42% disapprove). After the primary elections in mid-September, Lynch's approval rating rebounded (51% approve, 38% disapprove).

Democratic primary

Candidates

Declared
 John Lynch, incumbent Governor
 Timothy Robertson, state representative
 Frank Sullivan

Results

Republican primary

Candidates

Declared
 Frank Robert Emiro Sr., state representative
 Jack Kimball, businessman
 John Stephen, former Health and Human Services Commissioner
 Karen Testerman, conservative activist

Declined
 Kelly Ayotte, New Hampshire Attorney General
 Frank Guinta, Mayor of Manchester
 Chuck Morse, former State Senator
 John E. Sununu, former U.S. Senator

Polling

Results

General election

Candidates
 John Babiarz, Libertarian
 John Lynch, Democratic
 John Stephen, Republican

Predictions

Polling

With Kimball

With Morse

With Sununu

With Testerman

Results

References

External links
Election Division at New Hampshire Secretary of State
New Hampshire Governor Candidates at Project Vote Smart
Campaign contributions for 2010 New Hampshire Governor from Follow the Money
New Hampshire Governor 2010 from OurCampaigns.com
2010 New Hampshire Gubernatorial General Election: All Head-to-Head Matchups graph of multiple polls from Pollster.com
Election 2010: New Hampshire Governor from Rasmussen Reports
2010 New Hampshire Governor Race from Real Clear Politics
2010 New Hampshire Governor's Race from CQ Politics
Race Profile in The New York Times
Official campaign sites (Archived)
John Lynch for Governor
John Stephen for Governor

Gubernatorial
2010
New Hampshire